Oxytelus puncticeps is a species of rove beetle widely spread in Asia and Africa. It is found in China, Hong Kong, Taiwan, Japan, Philippines, Vietnam, Indonesia, Borneo, Sri Lanka, India, and Sub-Saharan Africa.

Description
A smaller species of rove beetle, male is about 2.6 mm and female is about 2.3 mm in length. Body is black in color. Labial palpi, legs, and elytra are light brown. In male, head is sub-pentagonal. Clypeus transverse. Mandibles are slender and slightly curved. Epistomal suture with lateral portions runs backward to the anterior marginal level of eyes. Eyes are convex with fine facets. Right mandible is stout, with obsoletely curved outer margin. Left mandible greatly larger with more curved. Pronotum transverse. Elytra punctate and rugose. Abdomen coriaceous and pubescent. Female is similar to male but smaller. Spermatheca constricted at near middle.

References 

Staphylinidae
Insects of Sri Lanka
Insects of India
Beetles described in 1859